Clan Ground is the second book in The Books of the Named series of young adult prehistoric fiction novels by Clare Bell. The book was originally published in 1984 and was re-released in 2010 with a new cover illustration by Lew Lashmit. The series follows a follows a group of sentient, prehistoric large cats called the Named, led by the female cat, Ratha. It also deals with their struggles against the group of non-sentient cats, the Unnamed.

Plot  
After the death of Meoran, the clan's tyrannical leader, young Ratha now leads the Named using the strength of the Red Tongue. She oversees the Firekeepers, members of the clan with a special charge and the rituals, herding, and governance; but she often wonders if the power of fire has corrupted them all. When Orange-eyes, a politically astute newcomer, joins the clan, Ratha is forced to decide how she will keep control or if she wants to keep control of the clan at all.

The book begins one year after Ratha's Creature, with the Named holding a feast in celebration of Ratha's defeat of the UnNamed and the birth of the Red-Tongue. A young UnNamed yearling comes to the clan seeking food and protection, and the Firekeepers taunt him and scorch his fur. Ratha however, is impressed by his courage in front of the Red-Tongue, and sees intelligence in his eyes. She allows him to join the clan, only to work for the Firekeepers and help them with small tasks. 

The newcomer, Orange-Eyes, has a limited vocabulary and understanding of clan life. He is shown to possibly be a different species than them, as he grows to be huge in comparison and grow long sabers. Orange-Eyes, now renamed Shongshar, mates with a clan female Bira, and has two cubs with her. Their cubs fail to show any signs of intelligence, and Ratha orders him to take them beyond clan borders and abandon them. Shongshar becomes bitter and enraged at Ratha's decision, and begins to build a cult of fire-worshippers in a nearby cave. Shongshar overthrows Ratha using the power of the Red-Tongue, and drives her out of her own clan. 

Ratha and Thakur devise a plan to flood the fire cave, where the heart of the Red Tongue is kept. They flood the cave by re-routing a stream above the cave, and Ratha kills Shongshar and retakes her place as clan leader.

Prequels
Ratha's Creature

Sequels
Ratha and Thistle-chaser
Ratha's Challenge
Ratha's Courage

American young adult novels
1984 American novels
Novels set in prehistory
Children's novels about animals